The 2017 SBS Drama Awards, presented by Seoul Broadcasting System (SBS), took place on December 31, 2017 at SBS Prism Tower, Sangam-dong, Mapo-gu, Seoul. It was hosted by Shin Dong-yup and Lee Bo-young.

Winners and nominees

Presenters

Special performances

See also
2017 KBS Drama Awards
2017 MBC Drama Awards

References

External links
2017 SBS Drama Awards official website 
2017 SBS Drama Awards FREE VOD

Seoul Broadcasting System original programming
2017 television awards
SBS Drama Awards
2017 in South Korea
December 2017 events in South Korea